Esox is a genus of freshwater fish commonly known as pike or pickerel.  It is the type genus of the family Esocidae.  The type species of the genus is Esox lucius, the northern pike. 

Esox has been present in Laurentia (which later became North America) and Eurasia since the Paleocene.  Modern large pike species are native to the Palearctic and Nearctic realms, ranging across Northern America and from Western Europe to Siberia in North Asia.

Pikes have the elongated, torpedo-like shape typical of predatory fishes, with sharply pointed heads and sharp teeth. Their coloration is typically grey-green with a mottled or spotted appearance with stripes along their backs, providing camouflage among underwater weeds, and each individual pike marking patterns are unique like fingerprints.

Etymology

The generic name Esox (pike fish) derives from the Greek ἴσοξ (ee-soks, a large fish) and appears to be cognate with Celtic, Welsh eog and Irish Gaelic iasc (fish), as well as alpine Gaulic *esosk which is consistent with the original indoeuropean root for the common word for fish, *pei(k)sk. Pliny uses the Latin form Esox in reference to a large fish in the Rhine normally identified with Salmonidae (lax or salmon). Carolus Linnæus attributes Esox to the pike fish which is of similar form and appearance but taxonomically different from the salmoniformes, whereas the first mention of Esox as a marine animal appears in the writings of Hesychius.

The English common name "pike" is an apparent shortening of "pike-fish", in reference to its pointed head, as the Old English word píc originally referring to a pickaxe. The plural of pike is also pike.

A Northern English and Lowland Scots name for the pike, ged, similarly derives from Old Norse gaddr (spike) (cf. the modern Swedish name for the pike, gädda, the Danish "gedde", the Norwegian "gjedde" and Scottish Gaelic: geadais).  The Dutch name for the pike (snoek) has been given to a wide variety of fish reminding sailors of the pike (see snoek, snook).

The English "pike" originally referred specifically to the adult fish, the diminutive form "pickerel" (now used to name some of the smaller pike species, e.g. E. americanus and E. niger) referring to the young. The walleye (Sander vitreus) is sometimes called a pickerel, but it is unrelated to the pike, being a member of the perch family (Percidae).  Pike are not to be confused with the unrelated pikeminnows of genus Ptychocheilus (family Cyprinidae) or pikeperch (Sander lucioperca) which is more akin to walleye than to pike.  Pike are also called "jackfish" in North America and informally "slough shark" in Western Canada.

Species
Currently, seven recognized species are placed in this genus:

Hybrids between Esox masquinongy and Esox lucius are well-known and referred to as the tiger muskellunge.

Fossil species

The oldest fossil species of Esox is Esox tiemani, from the late Paleocene aged Paskapoo Formation of Canada, which differs little from modern species. Other fossil species include Esox kronneri, from the Eocene of the Green River formation, and Esox nogaicus, is known from the Pleistocene of Ukraine, and species from the Miocene (Esox sibiricus) and Pliocene (Esox moldavicus) deposits from Ukraine, Poland, Kazakhstan, Mongolia, and Moldavia. Two additional fossil species, both from the Cretaceous of Alberta, Canada, are placed in their own genera: Estesesox foxi (Santonian to Campanian), and Oldmanesox canadensis (Campanian to Maastrichtian).

Diet

Pike feed on a wide range of food sources, predominantly smaller shoal fish. Pike are also cannibalistic, sometimes preying upon smaller members of their own species. This can be seen clearly in the northern pike.

They will also prey on insects and amphibians such as newts or frogs in times when their usual food is scarce, and occasionally on small mammals like moles or mice when caught water-borne. Small birds such as ducklings may become a target for hungry pike. Pike are also known to prey on swimming snakes.

They are, however, undeserving of their reputation for being overly vicious predators. There are few substantiated incidents of pike "attacks" on people.  Pike's further reputation as a pest seems to lie predominantly amongst a small handful of anglers and fishery managers who think, perhaps unfairly, that pike are a threat to native rough fish and also other sport fish.

Angling
 

Effective methods for catching this hard-fighting fish include dead baits, live baits, and lure fishing. Pike can easily be damaged when handled since they are not as robust as their reputation would suggest. Colour of lure can be influenced by water clarity and weather conditions. Since pike have numerous sharp teeth it is wise to take extreme care when unhooking them. The use of a wet leather gauntlet and surgical forceps to remove hooks is highly recommended on safety grounds. If practicing catch and release fishing, care for the pike should be the pike angler's utmost concern. The formerly recommended practice of grasping a pike by its eye sockets (misinterpreted as "its eyes") resulted in numerous released pike that quickly died from inability to see prey any longer.

The current recommended method of grasping pike is to close the hand firmly over the gill covers, and to make the period of handling as short as possible before release. Grabbing a pike by the gill covers is not feasible when a pike is very big, but it is easy to handle a pike by inserting the fingers at the bottom of the gill opening and grabbing the lower jaw. Big pike should also be supported at the belly. When a pike is held this way it is also easier to keep the mouth open to remove a hook. Some anglers now use special grips to grab the pike's front lower jaw, which can add to the safety of an anglers because of the danger imposed by the hooks of the lure or tackle and the pike's teeth. However these can cause serious damage to a pike's lower jaw. The Pike Anglers Club was formed in 1977 to campaign for the preservation of pike and the sport of pike fishing.

Pike are susceptible to gut hooking when fished for with natural bait. Upon taking the bait, the pike will hold it for a short time in its mouth as it moves off. The pike will then, usually, turn the bait in its mouth, so that it sits in alignment with its throat to ease swallowing. It is recommended that when pike fishing the process is not allowed to go this far and a strike is recommended as soon as a bite is indicated. Otherwise, what is known as gut hooking will result, which will normally kill or seriously injure the fish. Dutch research shows that cutting the line immediately when the fish is gut hooked will still give low mortality (14%). The hooks in the gut or stomach were either encapsulated or removed from the body. Placing hooks near the rear of the bait reduces the risk of deep hooking.

Other methods of catching and handing pike that are now frowned upon are the gaff and the gag. The gaff is a metal hook on the end of a pole used to hook through the fish's body in place of a more humane landing net. A gag is a device for holding open the pike's mouth whilst unhooking. These are now illegal in Scotland, as they put a huge amount of pressure on a pike's jaw, thus causing irreparable damage.

Cuisine

The taste of pike and pickerel is highly esteemed, but the "multitude of long, fine, forked bones" are problematic.
 The dish of quenelles de brochet (pike dumplings), which puts the meat through a sieve, was invented to deal with this. Indeed, Escoffier believed, falsely, that quenelles had completely displaced the whole fish from the menu.

Submarines and tanks
Two United States Navy submarines have been named Pike – SS-6 of 1903 and SS-173 of 1935 – and three – SS-22 of 1912, SS-177 of 1936, and SS-524 of 1944 – named Pickerel. In addition, the Soviet submarines known to NATO as the Victor III class and Akula class are called the Shchuka (Щука, "pike") class in Russian. The Soviet Iosif Stalin tank (IS-3) was also nicknamed Shchuka, in reference to its sharply pointed hull front.

Cultural significance

Mythology 
Russian mythology holds that the pike is one of several forms assumed by evil water spirits called vodyanoy, and a ravenous mythical pike is traditionally blamed for decimating the fish population in the Sheksna River. Russian fairy tales, on the other hand, also tell about an old wise pike that can fulfil wishes of the one who catches it, if its catcher releases it back into its habitat.

In the Finnish Kalevala, Väinämöinen creates a kantele (string instrument) from the jawbone of a pike.

Heraldry
In heraldry, the pike is called a lucy (English heraldry) or a ged (Scottish heraldry). It is usually blazoned either naiant (swimming), embowed (bowed) or hauriant (jumping), though pairs of lucies may appear addorsed (back to back), as in the arms of the Finnish town of Uusikaupunki (Argent, two lucies addorsed azure).

Literature 
In George R. R. Martin's A Song of Ice and Fire series of epic fantasy novels, both the seat and the highborn bastards of the Iron Islands are named "Pyke", likely inspired by the pike fish since the islands are inhabited by Vikings-like seafaring warriors who frequently pirate ships and raid the coastal regions.

References

External links

 
 Oxford English Dictionary, s.vv. "Esox", "Ged1", and "Pike, n.4".
 Pike in Your Waters, the Pike Anglers Club, pub 2003
 Pike Preservation - Fishing Equipment, Pike Fishing Scotland
 Float Tube Fishing In Ireland Pike Fishing from a Float Tube
 Pike Fishing in Denmark Coarse Fishing in Denmark
 Pike Fishing in Scotland Coarse Fishing in the Highlands
 River Swimming Water Safety mentions Pike attack as a risk of open water swimming. Accessed 21 October 2007

 
Fish in heraldry
Taxa named by Carl Linnaeus
Freshwater fish genera
Extant Santonian first appearances